Saleh Al-Omrani (born 16 March 1994) is a Saudi football player. He currently plays as a right-back .

References
 http://www.slstat.com/spl2015-2016ar/player.php?id=1554

1994 births
Living people
Saudi Arabian footballers
Al Omran Club players
Al-Nojoom FC players
Al-Qadsiah FC players
Al-Raed FC players
Al-Tai FC players
Al-Adalah FC players
Al-Orobah FC players
Al-Ain FC (Saudi Arabia) players
Al-Entesar Club players
Al-Sahel SC (Saudi Arabia) players
Saudi First Division League players
Saudi Professional League players
Saudi Second Division players
Association football fullbacks
Saudi Arabian Shia Muslims